Majnu is a 1987 Indian Telugu-language romantic tragedy film produced, written and directed by Dasari Narayana Rao. It stars Nagarjuna and Rajani, with music composed by Laxmikant–Pyarelal. The film released on 14 January 1987 alongside Sobhan Babu's Punnami Chandrudu, Balakrishna's Bhargava Ramudu and Krishna's Thandri Kodukula Challenge was recorded as a Blockbuster at the box office outperforming the other films. The film was remade in Tamil as Anand.

Plot
Rajesh (Nagarjuna) is a racy youngster who falls in love with Alekhya (Rajani). Things go well when Rajesh and Alekhya plan to get married, and that is when a root of suspicion lands in Rajesh's mind through a friend. The suspicion is something about Alekhya's character, and when Rajesh inquires about it, the latter gets furious. She questions Rajesh, asking him about how he can suspect her by believing a friend's word. She also comes to the conclusion that his love is not worth accepting. The impulsive-natured Rajesh also finds her questioning arrogant, and the couple breaks up. The real trouble starts for Rajesh after Alekhya leaves him, and he starts feeling sorry for his impulsive nature.

There Rajesh is absolutely worried about Alekhya & gets into depression. To get all the ducks into row, Rajesh's mother goes to Alekhya's house to fix the gap between Rajesh & Alekhya, where she finds out about Alekhya's senseless decision to marry Kapil Dev (Sudhakar), shown by her parents. Then Rajesh's mother coming to back to the house, concerned about Rajesh's  mental health deterioration, she lies to him that Alekhya is ready to marry him & there after she feeds him stomach full & is delighted. Then she spills the beans out about the actual scenario that happened at Alekhya's house & her decision to marry Kapil Dev. Listening to everything Rajesh is distraught. While his mother tries to console him. Meanwhile, Rajesh goes to a sink & starts vomiting everything that he ate & quotes that he cannot live happily without Alekhya.

The rest of the story is about what would happen to Rajesh and whether Alekhya forgives him or not. Final Caption Love Remains forever

Cast

Nagarjuna as Rajesh 
Rajani as Alekhya
Sudhakar as Kapil Dev, Alekhya's husband
Moon Moon Sen as Shalini
Kaikala Satyanarayana as Rajesh's father
J. V. Somayajulu as Gopala Krishna
Gummadi as Alekhya's grandfather
Sowcar Janaki as Alekhya's mother
K. R. Vijaya as Rajesh's mother
Suthi Velu
Rama Prabha

Soundtrack

The music was composed by Laxmikant–Pyarelal. Lyrics were written by Dasari Narayana Rao. Music was released on Lahari Music.

References

External links

1987 films
Indian romantic drama films
Films directed by Dasari Narayana Rao
Films scored by Laxmikant–Pyarelal
Telugu films remade in other languages
1980s Telugu-language films
1987 romantic drama films